Julie Halard-Decugis and Ai Sugiyama were the defending champions, but did not compete this year.

Lisa Raymond and Rennae Stubbs won the title, defeating Kimberly Po-Messerli and Nathalie Tauziat 6–2, 5–7, 7–5 in the final. It was the 3rd doubles Grand Slam title and the 6th doubles title of the year for the pair. It was also the 24th doubles title overall for Raymond and the 30th doubles title overall for Stubbs, in their respective careers.

Seeds

Qualifying

Draw

Finals

Top half

Section 1

Section 2

Bottom half

Section 3

Section 4

External links
 Official Results Archive (WTA)
2001 US Open – Women's draws and results at the International Tennis Federation

2001 US Open (tennis)
2001 WTA Tour
US Open (tennis) by year – Women's doubles
2001 in women's tennis
2001 in American women's sports